Hans Bernhard Skaset (born 10 April 1935) is a Norwegian civil servant and sports official.

He was born in Åfjord. He competed in athletics and was national champion in pentathlon and decathlon. He was a professor at the Norwegian School of Sport Sciences from 1975 to 1991. He chaired the Norwegian Athletics Federation from 1976 to 1983. He was president of the Norwegian Confederation of Sports from 1984 to 1990. Representing Kolbotn IL, he chaired the Norwegian Athletics Association from 1977 to 1983.

References

1935 births
Living people
People from Åfjord
Norwegian decathletes
Norwegian sports executives and administrators